"White Love" is the second collaboration single by labelmates K.Will, Sistar and Boyfriend, released under the name Starship Planet (Starship Entertainment). This digital single project is a way of thanking the fans who have cheered on Starship. The special digital single was released digitally on November 29, 2012.

Music video

Collaboration singles

References 

2012 singles
Korean-language songs
2012 songs
Starship Entertainment singles